Gulian Verplanck (1637–1684) (also known as Gulyne, Galyna and Geleyn) was a Dutch-American fur trader and merchant in colonial New York.

Early life
He was the eldest son of Abraham Isaacsen Verplanck, was a merchant, fur trader, and purchaser of a 1/3rd interest in what became the sprawling Rombout Patent in the southeast of the then Province of New York.  His younger sister, Catharina Verplanck, was the wife of David Pieterse Schuyler, the Dutch born fur trader who became an Alderman of Albany.

Career

Personal life
Verplanck was married to Hendrikja Wessels (also known as "Henrica"). Together, they were the parents of:

 Samuel Verplanck (1669–1698), who married Ariaantie "Harriet" Bayard, a daughter of Rev. Balthazar Bayard.
 Jacobus Verplanck (1671–1699), who married his first cousin, Margarita Schuyler, the youngest daughter of Philip Pieterse Schuyler.
 Abraham Verplanck (b. 1674)
 Anna Verplanck (b. 1680), who married merchant Andries "Andrew" Teller, a son of Andries Teller and Sophia ( Van Cortlandt) Teller.

Verplanck died in 1784.  After his death, his widow Henrica married Jacobus Kip, grandson of Hendrick Hendricksen Kip, and the family's share of the patent passed down through that line.

Descendants
Through his son Jacobus, he was a grandfather of Philip Verplanck (1695–1771), who married Gertrude Van Cortlandt, a granddaughter of Stephanus Van Cortlandt.

See also
 Philipse Patent

References

1630s births
1684 deaths
American merchants
American landowners
American fur traders